Fumie (written: 文江, 文恵, 文絵, 文枝, 史江, 史恵, 史絵, 章江, 章枝 or ふみえ in hiragana) is a feminine Japanese given name. Notable people with the name include:

, Japanese speed skater
, Japanese actress, singer, and model
, Japanese actress
, Japanese swimmer
, Japanese voice actress
, Japanese voice actress
, Japanese actress
, Japanese industrial designer
, Japanese figure skater
, Japanese stock critic and radio personality

See also
Fumi

Japanese feminine given names